The National Science Teaching Association (NSTA), founded in 1944 (as the National Science Teachers Association) and headquartered in Arlington, Virginia, is an association of science teachers in the United States and is the largest organization of science teachers worldwide. NSTA's current membership of roughly 40,000 includes science teachers, science supervisors, administrators, scientists, business and industry representatives, and others involved in and committed to science education.

The Association publishes a professional journal for each level of science teaching; a newspaper, NSTA Reports; and many other educational books and professional publications. Each year NSTA conducts a national conference and a series of area conferences. These events attract over 30,000 attendees annually. The Association serves as an advocate for science educators by keeping its members and the general public informed about national issues and trends in science education.

History 
NSTA was formed by the merger of two existing non-professional organizations, the American Science Teachers Association and the American Council of Science Teachers, at a July 1944 meeting in Pittsburgh, Pennsylvania. The organization was initially headquartered at Cornell University. This first permanent headquarters, purchased in 1972, was located on Connecticut Avenue in Washington, D.C and then moved to Arlington, Virginia in 1994.

Position statements
NSTA is engaged in an ongoing effort to "identify the qualities and standards of good science education," publishing its findings in the form of position statements. These position statements are developed by science educators, scientists, and other national experts in science education, and the input of NSTA's membership is solicited before final approval by the board of directors. Over 35 topics are covered, including The Nature of Science, Safety and Science Instruction, The Teaching of Evolution, Environmental education, Responsible Use of Live Animals and Dissection in the Science Classroom, Gender Equity in Science Education, and Use of the Metric System.

In 2018, the NSTA urged teachers to "emphasize to students that no scientific controversy exists regarding the basic facts of climate change."

Science Matters
Science Matters is a major public awareness and engagement campaign designed to rekindle a national sense of urgency and action among schools and families about the importance of science education and science literacy. Science Matters builds on the success of the Building a Presence for Science program, first launched in 1997 as an e-networking initiative to assist teachers of science with professional development opportunities. The Building a Presence for Science network—now the Science Matters network—reaches readers in 34 states and the District of Columbia.

Publications
Peer-reviewed journals:
 Science and Children, elementary level, established in 1963
 Science Scope, middle level, established in 1983
 The Science Teacher, high school, established in 1950
 Journal of College Science Teaching
 NSTA Recommends — review recommendations of science-teaching materials
 Connected Science Learning', linking in-school and out-of-school STEM learning

Books:

NSTA's publishing arm, NSTA Press, publishes 20–25 new titles per year. The NSTA Science Store offers selected publications from other publishers in addition to NSTA Press books.

NSTA student chapters
In addition to state/province chapters and associated groups, NSTA has over 100 student chapters. NSTA and the student chapters are separate but interdependent organizations that have elected to ally themselves to encourage professional development and networking of preservice teachers of science from across the United States and Canada.

NSTA affiliates
As of 2018, NSTA has the following affiliates:

 Association for Multicultural Science Education (AMSE)
 Association for Science Teacher Education (ASTE)
 Association of Science-Technology Centers (ASTC)
 Council for Elementary Science International (CESI)
 Council of State Science Supervisors (CSSS)
 NARST: A Worldwide Organization for Improving Science Teaching and Learning Through Research
 National Middle Level Science Teachers Association (NMLSTA)
 National Science Education Leadership Association (NSELA)
 Society for College Science Teachers (SCST)

See also
Virginia Association of Science Teachers

References

External links

National Science Teaching Association - official website

Teacher associations based in the United States
Academic organizations based in the United States
Educational organizations based in Virginia
1944 establishments in Pennsylvania
Organizations established in 1944
Organizations based in Arlington County, Virginia